The 2019 Liga 3 South Kalimantan is the fifth edition of Liga 3 (formerly known as Liga Nusantara) South Kalimantan as a qualifying round for the national round of 2019 Liga 3. Kotabaru, winner of the 2018 Liga 3 South Kalimantan are the defending champions. The competition began on 21 July 2019.

Format
In this competition, 14 teams are divided into 4 groups of three or four. The two best teams are through to knockout stage. The winner will represent South Kalimantan in the national round of 2019 Liga 3.

Teams
There are 14 clubs which will participate the league in this season.

Group stage
This stage started on 21 July 2019.

Group A

Group B

Group C

Group D

Knockout stage

References

2019 in Indonesian football